"This Masquerade" is a song written by American singer and musician Leon Russell. It was originally recorded in 1972 by Russell for his album Carney and as a B-side for the album's hit single "Tight Rope". The song was then covered on Helen Reddy's 1972 album, I Am Woman. It was then recorded by American vocal duo, the Carpenters, for their 1973 album Now & Then and as the B-side of the Carpenters's single "Please Mr. Postman". Three years later, "This Masquerade" was recorded by American singer and guitarist George Benson, who released it on his 1976 album, Breezin'. Benson's version, featuring Jorge Dalto on piano, was released as a single and became the first big hit of his career.

George Benson version
In 1976, "This Masquerade" was a top-ten pop and R&B hit for jazz guitarist/vocalist George Benson, who recorded it on his 1976 signature album Breezin'. It was his first single release. Benson's rendition is the only charting version of the song in the U.S. It reached number 10 on the Billboard Hot 100 and number three on the Hot Soul Singles chart. On the Cash Box Top 100 it reached #12. "This Masquerade" was most successful in Canada, where it reached number 8 on the Pop Singles chart as well as the Adult Contemporary chart.

In 1977, Benson's version won a Grammy Award for Record of the Year, while it was nominated for Song of the Year and for Best Pop Vocal Performance, Male.

Track listing

Music video
George Benson recorded an official music video for "This Masquerade" in 1976. In the video, the song has the same length as the song's single (3:17).

Chart history

Personnel
 Lead Vocal – George Benson
 Lead Guitar – George Benson
 Conductor, Arranged By – Claus Ogerman
 Piano [Soloist] – Jorge Dalto
 Rhythm Guitar – Phil Upchurch
 Bass – Stanley Banks
 Drums – Harvey Mason
 Percussion – Ralph MacDonald
 Producer – Tommy LiPuma

Trivia
Leon Russell's original version is part of the soundtrack for The Exorcist director William Friedkin's psychological thriller film Bug. The Bug Soundtrack was released on May 22, 2007. It also appeared in the movie The Pursuit of Happyness.
The Carpenters' version was also performed  on TV with Ella Fitzgerald; the medley in which it was sung was subsequently released on the compilation As Time Goes By.

References

External links
 
 Page of "This Masquerade" by George Benson at Discogs
 Page of "This Masquerade" by George Benson at 45cat

1972 songs
1976 singles
Songs written by Leon Russell
Leon Russell songs
The Carpenters songs
George Benson songs
Warner Records singles
Grammy Award for Record of the Year